Wilfried Krätzschmar (born 23 March 1944) is a German composer.

Life 
Born in Dresden, Krätzschmar received piano lessons from 1952. After his Abitur at the  he studied composition with Johannes Paul Thilman from 1962 to 1968, piano with Wolfgang Plehn and conducting with Klaus Zoephel at the Hochschule für Musik Carl Maria von Weber Dresden. In 1963 he conducted a trombone choir in Dresden. From 1968 to 1969 he took over the direction of incidental music at Theater Meiningen. After this time he returned to the Dresden Academy of Music as an aspirant of Fritz Geißler. In 1975 he took over artistically the Centre for the Promotion of Young Composers of the District of Dresden. In 1988 he was appointed extraordinary professor in Dresden. From 1991 to 2003 he was rector of the Dresden University of Music and from 1992 to 2009 full professor for musical composition. From 2011 to 2014 Krätzschmar was vice president and from 2014 to 2017 President of the Sächsische Akademie der Künste.

Awards 
 1971 Förderpreis des Carl-Maria-von-Weber-Wettbewerbes
 1972 and 1973 Mendelssohn Scholarship des Ministeriums für Kultur
 1979 Hans Stieber Prize of the Komponistenverbandes Halle
 1980  des Rundfunks der DDR
 1985 
 1986 Art Prize of the German Democratic Republic
 1990 Kritikerpreis der DDR-Musiktage
 2012  des Sächsischen Musikrates

Compositions  
 1974: Suoni notturni for solo flute and ensemble, UA Dresden
 1976: Hölderlin-Fragmente for solo flute and ensemble, UA Dresden
 1979: 1. Sinfonie, UA Dresden
 1980: 2. Sinfonie Explosionen und Cantus, UA Berlin
 1982: Heine-Szenen for baritone, choirs, organ and orchestra, UA Leipzig
 1982: 3. Sinfonie, UA Berlin
 1985: 4. Sinfonie, UA Dresden
 1987: scenario piccolo for piano and ensemble, UA Dresden
 1987: cataracta for orchestra, UA Berlin
 1988: Kammerkonzert II, UA Schwerin
 1991: und schon jetzt for two choirs and large ensemble, UA Dresden
 1993: Klanggewächse for orchestra, UA Pirna
 1993: Nachspiel zum Vormittag eines Ubu for ensemble, UA Berlin
 1995: Reigen for orchestra, UA 1995 Dresden
 1996: turns for six percussionists, UA Dresden
 1998: Kammerkonzert III, UA Dresden
 2003: age, spectra sonantia temporibus for orchestra, UA Dresden
 2006: Galopp – mouvement, UA Leipzig
 2006: Schlüsseloper. Ein burleskes Spiel, libretto Michael Wüstefeld, UA Dresden 
 2008: maga musica, Hymn for children choirs, UA Dresden
 2009: Doch es wird nicht dunkel bleiben for choir and percussion ensemble, UA Dresden
 2012: Fragmentum for two choirs and orchestra, UA Dresden
 2019: 5th Symphony, UA Dresden

Students 
Among his students were Michael Flade, Arnulf Herrmann, Caspar René Hirschfeld, Alexander Keuk, Ekkehard Klemm, Uwe Krause, Rolf Thomas Lorenz, Christian Münch, Theodor Schubach and Sylke Zimpel.

Further reading

References

External links 
 
 
 Wilfried Krätzschmar on Webarchive at the Hochschule für Musik Carl Maria von Weber Dresden

20th-century classical composers
German male classical composers
20th-century German composers
20th-century German male musicians
German composers
1944 births
Living people
Musicians from Dresden